The Darzens reaction (also known as the Darzens condensation or glycidic ester condensation) is the chemical reaction of a ketone or aldehyde with an α-haloester in the presence of a base to form an α,β-epoxy ester, also called a "glycidic ester".  This reaction was discovered by the organic chemist Auguste Georges Darzens in 1904.

Reaction mechanism
The reaction process begins when a strong base is used to form a carbanion at the halogenated position. Because of the ester, this carbanion is a resonance-stabilized enolate, which makes it relatively easy to form. This nucleophilic structure attacks another carbonyl component, forming a new carbon–carbon bond. These first two steps are similar to a base-catalyzed aldol reaction. The oxygen anion in this aldol-like product then does an intramolecular SN2 attack on the formerly-nucleophilic halide-bearing position, displacing the halide to form an epoxide. This reaction sequence is thus a condensation reaction since there is a net loss of HCl when the two reactant molecules join.

The primary role of the ester is to enable the initial deprotonation to occur, and other carbonyl functional groups can be used instead. If the starting material is an α-halo amide, the product is an α,β-epoxy amide. If an α-halo ketone is used, the product is an α,β-epoxy ketone.

Any sufficiently strong base can be used for the initial deprotonation. However, if the starting material is an ester, the alkoxide corresponding to the ester side-chain is commonly chosen in order to prevent complications due to potential acyl exchange side reactions.

Stereochemistry 
Depending on the specific structures involved, the epoxide may exist in cis and trans forms. A specific reaction may give only cis, only trans, or a mixture of the two. The specific stereochemical outcome of the reaction is affected by several aspects of the intermediate steps in the sequence.

The initial stereochemistry of the reaction sequence is established in the step where the carbanion attacks the carbonyl. Two sp3 (tetrahedral) carbons are created at this stage, which allows two different  diastereomeric possibilities of the halohydrin intermediate. The most likely result is due to chemical kinetics: whichever product is easier and faster to form will be the major product of this reaction. The subsequent SN2 reaction step proceeds with stereochemical inversion, so the cis or trans form of the epoxide is controlled by the kinetics of an intermediate step. Alternately, the halohydrin can epimerize due to the basic nature of the reaction conditions prior to the SN2 reaction. In this case, the initially formed diastereomer can convert to a different one. This is an equilibrium process, so the cis or trans form of the epoxide is controlled by chemical thermodynamics—the product resulting from the more stable diastereomer, regardless of which one was the kinetic result.

Alternative reactions 

Glycidic esters can also be obtained via nucleophilic epoxidation of an α,β-unsaturated ester, but that approach requires synthesis of the alkene substrate first whereas the Darzens condensation allows formation of the carbon–carbon connectivity and epoxide ring in a single reaction.

Subsequent reactions 

The product of the Darzens reaction can be reacted further to form various types of compounds. Hydrolysis of the ester can lead to decarboxylation, which triggers a rearrangement of the epoxide into a carbonyl (4). Alternately, other epoxide rearrangements can be induced to form other structures.

See also 
 Johnson–Corey–Chaykovsky reaction
 Reformatskii reaction

References 

Addition reactions
Carbon-carbon bond forming reactions
Epoxidation reactions
Epoxides
Name reactions